Soldiers of Freedom is a four-part 1977 film epic directed by Yuri Ozerov and starring Mikhail Ulyanov, Yevgeny Matveyev, Vasily Lanovoy. It is a World War II historical drama and the sequel to 1970-71's Liberation.

Plot
The film reflects the following events of World War II: the capitulation of Friedrich Paulus's Sixth Army as a result of the failed assault on Stalingrad during Operation Blue in 1942; the preparation for revolt in Slovakia; negotiations of the Polish communists with Władysław Sikorski's government over their joint struggle against fascism; the creation of a National Committee of the Domestic Front in Bulgaria and preparation by underground workers-communists for armed revolt; expansion of the guerrilla (partisan) movement; the failure of a German attempt to destroy People's Liberation Army of Josip Broz Tito; one of the largest military operations, Bagration; the beginning of the liberation of Poland; creation of the Polish National Government in Lublin; the Warsaw Uprising; the capitulation of Bór-Komorowski and defeat of the Polish patriots; the entry of Soviet and Polish armies into Warsaw.

Cast
Mikhail Ulyanov - Marshal Zhukov
Yevgeny Matveyev - Leonid Brezhnev
Vasily Lanovoy - Andrei Grechko
Stefan Getsov - Georgi Dimitrov
Viktor Avdyushko - Marshal Ivan Konev
Bohus Pastorek - Klement Gottwald
Horst Preusker - Wilhelm Pieck
Yakov Tripolsky - Joseph Stalin
Lubomir Kabakchiyev - Palmiro Togliatti
Boris Belov - Maurice Thorez
Peter Stefanou - Todor Zhivkov
Vladlen Davydov - Marshal Konstantin Rokossovsky
Károly Ujlaky - János Kádár
Miklós Benedek - Gen. Ludvík Svoboda
Anton Gorchev - Dobri Dzhurov
Violeta Bahchevanova - Roza Dimitrova
Valentin Kazancki - Winston Churchill
Stanisław Jaśkiewicz - Franklin D. Roosevelt
Naum Shopov - Tzar Boris III
Fritz Diez - Adolf Hitler
Gerd Michael Henneberg - Wilhelm Keitel
Horst Gill - Otto Günsche
Pavel Popandov - Tzano Velchev
Valentin Gadzhokov - Atanas Hadzhiyanchev
Zlatko Pavlov - Zdravko
Nikolai Ouzounov - Tzvyatko
Zbigniew Józefowicz - Piotr Jaroszewicz
Edward Linde-Lubaszenko - Edward Gierek
Jerzy Turek
Constantin Fugașin - Nicolae Ceaușescu

External links

Soldiers of Freedom.Kino-teatr.ru 

1977 films
Soviet war films
Mosfilm films
1970s Russian-language films
1977 drama films
Films set in 1942
Films set in 1943
Films set in 1944
Films set in 1945
Films directed by Yuri Ozerov
Czech resistance to Nazi occupation in film
War films set in Partisan Yugoslavia
Cultural depictions of Joseph Stalin
Cultural depictions of Leonid Brezhnev
Cultural depictions of Adolf Hitler
Cultural depictions of Winston Churchill
Cultural depictions of Franklin D. Roosevelt
Cultural depictions of Georgy Zhukov
Cultural depictions of Josip Broz Tito
Soviet World War II films
Russian World War II films
Films about Polish resistance during World War II
Soviet epic films